Miljković is a South Slavic surname, derived from the masculine given name Miljko. It is predominantly Serbian, also found in the rest of former Yugoslavia. It may refer to:
Aleksandar Miljković (footballer born 1982) (born 1982), Serbian footballer
Aleksandar Miljković (footballer born 1990) (born 1990), Serbian footballer
Alexander Miljković, Serbian classical doublebassist
Boris Miljković (born 1956), prolific Serbian artist, TV and theatre director, video artist, creative director, etc.
Branko Miljković (1934–1961), iconic Serbian poet
Emil Miljković (born 1988), Bosnian footballer
Ivan Miljković (born 1979), Serbian volleyball player
Ivica Miljković (born 1947), former Croatian football player
Husein Miljković (1905–1944), Bosnian Muslim military commander
Nemanja Miljković (1990–2020), Serbian basketball player
Viki Miljković (born 1974), Serbian singer, popular in the former Yugoslav republics
Vojkan Miljković (born 1991), Serbian footballer

Serbian surnames
Croatian surnames